Dan Poncet is a contemporary French painter.

Born on 14 July 1953 at the château de Saint-Just in Ain department, France. She graduated in 1972 from the École nationale supérieure d'architecture de Lyon and thereafter from the École nationale des beaux-arts de Lyon.

Her first paintings show an influence of impressionism and of fauvism. After 1975 she returned to realism and to old techniques used in 17th-century paintings, such as  glaze, pâtes or demi-pâtes.

After meeting rosarian Jean Pierre Guillot in 1997, she also produced a series of  paintings with subjects related to roses such as "Cueillette dans le Jardin de Roses". Guillot named a rose cultivar "Dan Poncet".
C'est en 1972, que Dan Poncet entre à l'Ecole d'Architecture de Lyon, puis l'année suivante aux Beaux Arts.
In  1974, she discovered realitism and the old techniques of the workshop of  Hubert Gaillard. 
Un enseignement de rigueur, de souveraine précision, qui aujourd'hui prévaut dans sa propre facture. Passionnée par la beauté de la nature et l'esthétisme en tout, elle sait distiller le rêve et l'humour dans une élégante légèreté de touche. Sous le trait perce la fantaisie et sa palette, lumineuse, ignore le sombre et le ténébreux. 
Aux multiples facettes de ses thèmes, elle cisèle les petits et grands bonheurs : fleurs et couleurs chatoyantes en courbes épanouies, galbes de femmes fleurs en dentelles romantiques, jardins luxuriants et sujets croqués dans sa campagne de l' Ain où elle vit depuis toujours. 
C'est aussi ses impressions de lointains voyages qui l'ont marquée tout autant que l'approche journalière des animaux qui l'entourent : chats énigmatiques, chiens cabotins et chevaux altiers et câlins...et, dans une série particulière, au réalisme fantastique, ses grenouilles immortalisées dans un monde étrange où métiers, passions et travers humains se transposent en métaphores, en batraciennes charges humaines. 
On remarque ses fantasmes exotiques ou furtivement érotiques qu'elle peaufine en grands plans maxi réaliste. Ailleurs, ce sont les prouesses techniques du trompe-l'oeil quand sur la toile "se conte une histoire, dans une savante mise en scène qui révèle la recherche poétique de mes univers quotidiens", confie-t-elle.

References

 http://www.dan-poncet.fr/ - Réalisme fantastique : les grenouilles, mais aussi le Passion des fleurs

1953 births
21st-century French painters
20th-century French painters
20th-century French male artists
French women painters
Living people
20th-century French women artists
21st-century French women artists